The 1984 Montana gubernatorial election took place on November 6, 1984. Incumbent Governor of Montana Ted Schwinden, who was first elected in 1980, ran for re-election. Schwinden won the Democratic primary against a perennial candidate, and moved on to the general election, where he faced Pat M. Goodover, a State Senator and the Republican nominee. Although then-President Ronald Reagan won the state in a landslide that year in the presidential election, Schwinden defeated Goodover with over 70% of the vote to win his second and final term as governor.

Democratic primary

Candidates
Ted Schwinden, incumbent Governor of Montana
Bob Kelleher, perennial candidate

Results

Republican primary

Candidates
Pat M. Goodover, State Senator

Results

General election

Results

References

Montana
Gubernatorial
1984